This is a list of nominated candidates for the Liberal Party of Canada in the 40th Canadian federal election.

Newfoundland and Labrador - 7 seats

Prince Edward Island - 4 seats

Nova Scotia - 11 seats

New Brunswick - 10 seats

Quebec - 75 seats

Ontario - 106 seats

Manitoba - 14 Seats

Saskatchewan - 14 seats

Alberta - 28 seats

British Columbia - 36 seats

Yukon - 1 seat

Northwest Territories - 1 seat

Nunavut - 1 seat

See also
Results of the Canadian federal election, 2008
Results by riding for the Canadian federal election, 2008

References

2008